400 (four hundred) is the natural number following 399 and preceding 401.

Mathematical properties 

400 is the square of 20. 400 is the sum of the powers of 7 from 0 to 3, thus making it a repdigit in base 7 (1111).

A circle is divided into 400 grads, which is equal to 360 degrees and 2π radians. (Degrees and radians are the SI accepted units).

400 is a self number in base 10, since there is no integer that added to the sum of its own digits results in 400. On the other hand, 400 is divisible by the sum of its own base 10 digits, making it a Harshad number.

Other fields 

Four hundred is also
 The Four Hundred (oligarchy) of ancient Athens.
 An HTTP status code for a bad client request.
 The Four Hundred (sometimes The Four Hundred Club) a phrase meaning the wealthiest, most famous, or most powerful social group (see, e.g., Ward McAllister), leading to the generation of such lists as the Forbes 400.
 The Atari 400 home computer.
 A former limited stop bus route which operated from Bolton to Stockport and Manchester Airport from 1970 to 2004, known as the Trans-Lancs Express.
 in the title of the film Les Quatre Cent Coups (The 400 Blows), a French film directed by François Truffaut.
 A Lebanese card game, 400 (card game).
 the designation for a class of Ontario highways called 400-Series Highways.
 The 400, later the Twin Cities 400, a Chicago and North Western Railway passenger train that traveled 400 miles between Minneapolis/St. Paul and Chicago, Illinois in 400 minutes.
 The yard number of the RMS Olympic, the RMS Titanic's sister ship.
 .400 (2 hits out of 5 at-bats) is a numerically significant annual batting average statistic in Major League Baseball, last accomplished by Ted Williams of the Boston Red Sox in 1941.
 The number of days in a Gregorian calendar year changes according to a cycle of exactly 400 years, of which 97 are leap years and 303 are common.
 The Intertestamental period or period of time between the writings of the Hebrew Bible and the Christian New Testament texts is traditionally considered to be a roughly four hundred-year period.
 The Sun is approximately 400 times the size of the Moon but also is approximately 400 times further away, creating the temporary illusion in which the Sun and Moon in Earth's sky appear as if of similar size.
 In gematria 400 is the largest single number that can be represented without using the Sophit forms (see Kaph, Mem, Nun, Pe, and Tzade).
 List of highways numbered 400

Integers from 401 to 499

400s

401
A prime number, tetranacci number, sum of seven consecutive primes (43 + 47 + 53 + 59 + 61 + 67 + 71), sum of nine consecutive primes (29 + 31 + 37 + 41 + 43 + 47 + 53 + 59 + 61), Chen prime, Eisenstein prime with no imaginary part, prime index prime, Mertens function returns 0, member of the Mian–Chowla sequence. 
HTTP status code for "Unauthorized", area code for Rhode Island, also in the name of a retirement plan, 401(k). Stephen Colbert's Formula 401, a "man seed" based product brand his persona on The Colbert Report promotes for sale to the public .
Ontario Highway 401, colloquially referred to as the four-oh-one, is a popular Canadian highway 817.9 kilometres (508.2 mi) that stretches from Windsor to the Quebec border, passing through Toronto. It turns into Quebec Autoroute 20 at the Quebec/Ontario border which leads to the cities of Montreal and Quebec.

402
402 = 2 × 3 × 67, sphenic number, nontotient, Harshad number, number of graphs with 8 nodes and 9 edges
HTTP status code for "Payment Required", area code for Nebraska

403
403 = 13 × 31, heptagonal number, Mertens function returns 0.
 First number that is the product of an emirp pair.
 HTTP 403, the status code for "Forbidden"
 Also in the name of a retirement plan in the United States, 403(b).
 The area code for southern Alberta.

404
404 = 22 × 101, Mertens function returns 0, nontotient, noncototient, number of integer partitions of 20 with an alternating permutation. 
 HTTP status code for "Not Found", perhaps the most famous HTTP status code.
 Section 404 of the Sarbanes–Oxley Act.
 One of the three area codes of the Atlanta calling area.

405
405 = 34 × 5, Mertens function returns 0, Harshad number, pentagonal pyramidal number; 
 HTTP status code for "Method Not Allowed".
 Area code for central Oklahoma, including Oklahoma City and surrounding suburbs.
 Interstate 405 is a major, heavily traveled freeway in Southern California, known to the local as "The 405".

406
406 = 2 × 7 × 29, sphenic number, triangular number, centered nonagonal number, nontotient
HTTP status code for "Not Acceptable".

406 is a poem by John Boyle O'Reilly. It was believed to have been the number of one of O'Reilly's prison cells, and was the number of his first hotel room after he arrived in the United States. Hence the number had a mystical significance to him, as intimated in the poem.
Peugeot 406 car.
Area code for all of Montana.

407
407 = 11 × 37,
sum of cubes of 4, 0 and 7 (43 + 03 + 73 = 407); narcissistic number
sum of three consecutive primes (131 + 137 + 139)
Mertens function returns 0
Harshad number
lazy caterer number 
HTTP status code for "Proxy Authentication Required"
Area code for Orlando, Florida
Colloquial name for the Express Toll Route in Ontario

408
408 = 23 × 3 × 17
Sum of four consecutive primes (97 + 101 + 103 + 107)
Sum of eight consecutive primes (37 + 41 + 43 + 47 + 53 + 59 + 61 + 67)
Pell number
Mertens function returns 0
Octagonal number
Untouchable number
Harshad number
HTTP status code for "Request Timeout"
Area code for the Silicon Valley

409
409 is a prime number, Chen prime, centered triangular number.

A family of cleaning products, Formula 409
An engine known as the Chevrolet 409, a 409 cubic inch W-series V8.
The song "409" by The Beach Boys, inspired by the above engine
HTTP status code for "Conflict"
A Green Day song, "409 in Your Coffeemaker", included on their album 1,039/Smoothed Out Slappy Hours
The area code for a part of eastern Texas
 Venice has 409 bridges.
A Bullet For My Valentine song, "Room 409", from the album The Poison
 Joe Paterno holds the record as the winningest head coach in NCAA FBS with 409 victories.

410s

410
410 = 2 × 5 × 41, sphenic number, sum of six consecutive primes (59 + 61 + 67 + 71 + 73 + 79), nontotient, Harshad number, number of triangle-free graphs on 8 vertices
HTTP status code for "Gone".
 Area Code 410, a telephone area code for the US State of Maryland, representing portions of the state including the Baltimore metropolitan area and the Eastern Shore.

411
411 = 3 × 137, self number, 
HTTP status code for "Length Required", slang for information (see 4-1-1)
The number of possible FM broadcasting frequencies between 87.50 and 108.00 MHz in 50 kHz spacing countries

412
412 = 22 × 103, nontotient, noncototient, sum of twelve consecutive primes (13 + 17 + 19 + 23 + 29 + 31 + 37 + 41 + 43 + 47 + 53 + 59), 41264 + 1 is prime
 HTTP status code for "Precondition Failed"
 Area code for Pittsburgh, Pennsylvania.
 Fictitious Police Code for "Overacting" from "St. George and the Dragonet" - Stan Freeberg

413
413 = 7 × 59, Mertens function returns 0, self number, Blum integer
HTTP status code for "Request Entity Too Large"
 Area code for Western Massachusetts.
An important and recurring number in the webcomic Homestuck by Andrew Hussie.

414
414 = 2 × 32 × 23, Mertens function returns 0, nontotient, Harshad number, number of balanced partitions of 31
 is prime
 HTTP status code for "Request-URI Too Long"
 Area code for Milwaukee, Wisconsin.
 The 414s, a group of hackers from Milwaukee, Wisconsin.

415
415 = 5 × 83, logarithmic number
HTTP status code for "Unsupported Media Type"
 415 Records, a record label
 415 refers to California Penal Code, section 415, pertaining to public fighting, public disturbance, and public use of offensive words likely to provoke an immediate violent reaction.
Area code 415, a telephone area code for San Francisco, California

416
416 = 25 × 13, number of independent vertex sets and vertex covers in the 6-sunlet graph
HTTP status code for "Requested Range Not Satisfiable"
416 is also a nickname for the city of Toronto, based on the area code it used before overlay plans added two more area codes.

417
417 = 3 × 139, Blum integer
HTTP status code for "Expectation Failed". Also the area code for southwestern Missouri, including Springfield, and Joplin.

418
418 = 2 × 11 × 19, sphenic number, balanced number
 the number of Abrahadabra
 Hyper Text Coffee Pot Control Protocol status code for "Teapot" as an April Fools' joke.

419
A prime number, Sophie Germain prime, Chen prime, Eisenstein prime with no imaginary part, highly cototient number, Mertens function returns 0
refers to the Nigerian advance fee fraud scheme (after the section of the Nigerian Criminal Code it violates)

420s

420
420 = 22 × 3 × 5 × 7

421
 A prime number, sum of five consecutive primes (73 + 79 + 83 + 89 + 97), centered square number, also SMTP code meaning the transmission channel will be closing
 Country calling code for Slovakia

422
422 = 2 × 211, Mertens function returns 0, nontotient, since 422 = 202 + 20 + 2 it is the maximum number of regions into which 21 intersecting circles divide the plane.

423
423 = 32 × 47, Mertens function returns 0, Harshad number, number of secondary structures of RNA molecules with 10 nucleotides
 Country calling code for Liechtenstein

424
424 = 23 × 53, sum of ten consecutive primes (23 + 29 + 31 + 37 + 41 + 43 + 47 + 53 + 59 + 61), Mertens function returns 0, refactorable number, self number

425
425 = 52 × 17, pentagonal number, centered tetrahedral number, sum of three consecutive primes (137 + 139 + 149), Mertens function returns 0, the second number that can be expressed as the sum of two squares in three different ways (425 = 202 + 52 = 192 + 82 = 162 + 132). 
 425 is an area code in Washington State.

426
426 = 2 × 3 × 71, sphenic number, nontotient, untouchable number

427
427 = 7 × 61, Mertens function returns 0. 427! + 1 is prime.

428
428 = 22 × 107, Mertens function returns 0, nontotient, 42832 + 1 is prime
428: Shibuya Scramble, a video game

429
429 = 3 × 11 × 13, sphenic number, Catalan number

430s

430
430 = 2 × 5 × 43, number of primes below 3000, sphenic number, untouchable number

431
A prime number, Sophie Germain prime, sum of seven consecutive primes (47 + 53 + 59 + 61 + 67 + 71 + 73), Chen prime, prime index prime,  Eisenstein prime with no imaginary part
It is also the fourth Leyland prime of the second kind.
Area code 431 is a telephone area code for Manitoba, Canada.

432
432 = 24 × 33 = 42 × 33, the sum of four consecutive primes (103 + 107 + 109 + 113), a Harshad number, a highly totient number, an Achilles number and the sum of totient function for first 37 integers. 432! is the first factorial that is not a Harshad number in base 10. 432 is also three-dozen sets of a dozen, making it three gross.

433
A prime number, Markov number, star number.
 The perfect score in the game show Fifteen To One, only ever achieved once in over 2000 shows. 
 433 can refer to composer John Cage's composition 4′33″ (pronounced "Four minutes, thirty-three seconds" or just "Four thirty-three").

434
434 = 2 × 7 × 31, sphenic number, sum of six consecutive primes (61 + 67 + 71 + 73 + 79 + 83), nontotient, maximal number of pieces that can be obtained by cutting an annulus with 28 cuts

435
435 = 3 × 5 × 29, sphenic number, triangular number, hexagonal number, self number, number of compositions of 16 into distinct parts
 The number of members in the US House of Representatives.

436
436 = 22 × 109, nontotient, noncototient, lazy caterer number

437
437 = 19 × 23, Blum integer

438
438 = 2 × 3 × 73, sphenic number, Smith number. 
The "438 match" or "438 game" has been used by cricket media to describe the famous 2006 One Day International in which Australia scored a world record 434 in their innings, only to see South Africa respond in their innings with 438.

439
A prime number, sum of three consecutive primes (139 + 149 + 151), sum of nine consecutive primes (31 + 37 + 41 + 43 + 47 + 53 + 59 + 61 + 67), strictly non-palindromic number

440s

440

440 = 23 × 5 × 11, the sum of the first seventeen prime numbers, Harshad number, 
in hertz, the standard frequency to which most orchestras tune the pitch A above middle C. A few orchestras tune slightly flatter or sharper than this.

441
441 = 32 × 72 = 212
 441 is the sum of the cubes of the first 6 natural numbers (441 = 13 + 23 + 33 + 43 + 53 + 63).
 441 is a centered octagonal number, a refactorable number, and a Harshad number.
 441 is the number of squares on a Super Scrabble board.

442
442 = 2 × 13 × 17 = 212 + 1, sphenic number, sum of eight consecutive primes (41 + 43 + 47 + 53 + 59 + 61 + 67 + 71)

443
A prime number, Sophie Germain prime, Chen prime, Eisenstein prime with no imaginary part, Mertens function sets new low of -9, which stands until 659.
In computing, it is the default port for HTTPS connections.

444
444 = 22 × 3 × 37, refactorable number, Harshad number, number of noniamonds without holes.
 The title of the final track of Autechre's 1993 debut album Incunabula.
The 444th Fighter Squadron "Spare", a fictional air squadron in Ace Combat 7: Skies Unknown.

445
445 = 5 × 89, number of series-reduced trees with 17 nodes

446
446 = 2 × 223, nontotient, self number

447
447 = 3 × 149, number of 1's in all partitions of 22 into odd parts
 The flight number of Air France Flight 447

448
448 = 26 × 7, untouchable number, refactorable number, Harshad number

449
A prime number, sum of five consecutive primes (79 + 83 + 89 + 97 + 101), Chen prime, Eisenstein prime with no imaginary part, Proth prime. Also the largest number whose factorial is less than 101000

450s

450
450 = 2 × 32 × 52, nontotient, sum of totient function for first 38 integers, refactorable number, Harshad number, 
SMTP code meaning the requested mail action was not carried out.
A perfect score in Canadian five-pin bowling.
An area code in Southern Quebec.

451
451 = 11 × 41; 451 is a Wedderburn–Etherington number and a centered decagonal number; its reciprocal has period 10; 451 is the smallest number with this period reciprocal length.
The novel Fahrenheit 451 refers to the temperature in Fahrenheit that author Ray Bradbury understood to be the autoignition point of paper.
HTTP status code for "Unavailable For Legal Reasons" a HTTP response error when the user requests an illegal resource, such as a web page censored by a government.

452
452 = 22 × 113, number of surface-points of a tetrahedron with edge-length 15
SMTP code meaning that the requested mail action was not carried out because of insufficient system storage

453
453 = 3 × 151, Blum integer

454
454 = 2 × 227, nontotient, a Smith number

455
455 = 5 × 7 × 13, sphenic number, tetrahedral number
455 Rocket is the title of a song by Kathy Mattea
455 kHz is a standard intermediate frequency for analog superheterodyne AM broadcast band receivers.
The sum of the squares of the first 455 primes is divisible by 455.

456
456 = 23 × 3 × 19, sum of a twin prime (227 + 229), sum of four consecutive primes (107 + 109 + 113 + 127), centered pentagonal number, icosahedral number

 In the TV show Torchwood: Children of Earth, the antagonists were an alien species with the designation 456.
 Number of contestants in the South Korean Netflix drama Squid Game.

457
 A prime number, sum of three consecutive primes (149 + 151 + 157), self number.
 The international standard frequency for radio avalanche transceivers (457 kHz).

458
458 = 2 × 229, nontotient, number of partitions of 24 into divisors of 24

459
459 = 33 × 17, triangular matchstick number
459 West 18th Street, a residential building at that address in Manhattan's West Chelsea neighborhood, built in 2008.

460s

460
460 = 22 × 5 × 23, centered triangular number, dodecagonal number, Harshad number, sum of twelve consecutive primes (17 + 19 + 23 + 29 + 31 + 37 + 41 + 43 + 47 + 53 + 59 + 61)

461
A prime number, Chen prime, sexy prime with 467, Eisenstein prime with no imaginary part, prime index prime

462
462 = 2 × 3 × 7 × 11, binomial coefficient , stirling number of the second kind , sum of six consecutive primes (67 + 71 + 73 + 79 + 83 + 89), pronic number, sparsely totient number, idoneal number

463
A prime number, sum of seven consecutive primes (53 + 59 + 61 + 67 + 71 + 73 + 79), centered heptagonal number, 
Number of days in the synodic period of Ceres
A common baseball double play (see baseball positions)
A single by Buck 65, named after the baseball term

464

464 = 24 × 29, primitive abundant number, since 464 = 212 + 21 + 2 it is the maximum number of regions into which 22 intersecting circles divide the plane, maximal number of pieces that can be obtained by cutting an annulus with 29 cuts

 In chess it is the number of legal positions of the kings, not counting mirrored positions. Has some importance when constructing an endgame tablebase.
 Model number of the home computer Amstrad CPC 464.

465
465 = 3 × 5 × 31, sphenic number, triangular number, member of the Padovan sequence, Harshad number

466
466 = 2 × 233, noncototient, lazy caterer number

467
A prime number, safe prime, sexy prime with 461, Chen prime, Eisenstein prime with no imaginary part
 is prime

468
468 = 22 × 32 × 13, sum of ten consecutive primes (29 + 31 + 37 + 41 + 43 + 47 + 53 + 59 + 61 + 67), refactorable number, self number, Harshad number

469
469 = 7 × 67, centered hexagonal number. 
469! - 1 is prime.

470s

470
470 = 2 × 5 × 47, sphenic number, nontotient, noncototient, cake number
 In golf, 470 is the minimum length in yards from the tee to the hole on a Par 5.
 470 is an Olympic class of sailing dinghy

471
471 = 3 × 157, sum of three consecutive primes (151 + 157 + 163), perfect totient number, φ(471) = φ(σ(471)).

472
472 = 23 × 59, nontotient, untouchable number, refactorable number, number of distinct ways to cut a 5 × 5 square into squares with integer sides
The Amstrad CPC472 was a short-lived home computer for the Spanish market.

473
473 = 11 × 43, sum of five consecutive primes (83 + 89 + 97 + 101 + 103), Blum integer

474
474 = 2 × 3 × 79, sphenic number, sum of eight consecutive primes (43 + 47 + 53 + 59 + 61 + 67 + 71 + 73), nontotient, noncototient, sum of totient function for first 39 integers, untouchable number, nonagonal number

475
475 = 52 × 19, 49-gonal number, member of the Mian–Chowla sequence.

476
476 = 22 × 7 × 17, Harshad number, admirable number

477
477 = 32 × 53, pentagonal number

478
478 = 2 × 239, Companion Pell number, number of partitions of 26 that do not contain 1 as a part

479
A prime number, safe prime, sum of nine consecutive primes (37 + 41 + 43 + 47 + 53 + 59 + 61 + 67 + 71), Chen prime, Eisenstein prime with no imaginary part, self number
 Also an area code in the U.S. state of Arkansas.

480s

480
480 = 25 × 3 × 5, sum of a twin prime (239 + 241), sum of four consecutive primes (109 + 113 + 127 + 131), highly totient number, refactorable number, Harshad number
 is prime

481
481 = 13 × 37, octagonal number, centered square number, Harshad number

482
482 = 2 × 241, nontotient, noncototient, number of series-reduced planted trees with 15 nodes

483
483 = 3 × 7 × 23, sphenic number, Smith number

484
484 = 22 × 112 = 222, palindromic square, nontotient

485
485 = 5 × 97, number of triangles (of all sizes, including holes) in Sierpiński's triangle after 5 inscriptions
 RS-485

486
486 = 2 × 35, Harshad number, Perrin number
 Shorthand for the Intel 80486 microprocessor chip.

487
A prime number, sum of three consecutive primes (157 + 163 + 167),  Chen prime, 
 The only primes under 7.74 × 1013 that divide their own decimal repetends are 3, 487, and 56598313.
 Shorthand for the Intel 80487 floating point processor chip.

488
488 = 23 × 61, nontotient, refactorable number, φ(488) = φ(σ(488)), number of surface points on a cube with edge-length 10.

489
489 = 3 × 163, octahedral number

490s

490
490 = 2 × 5 × 72, noncototient, sum of totient function for first 40 integers, partition number (integer partitions of 19), self number.
The Christian Gospel of Matthew (Matthew 18:21-22) says that Jesus told Peter to forgive his brother "seventy times seven" times when his brother sins against him .

491
A prime number, isolated prime, Sophie Germain prime, Chen prime, Eisenstein prime with no imaginary part, strictly non-palindromic number

492
492 = 22 × 3 × 41, sum of six consecutive primes (71 + 73 + 79 + 83 + 89 + 97), refactorable number, member of a Ruth–Aaron pair with 493 under first definition

493
493 = 17 × 29, sum of seven consecutive primes (59 + 61 + 67 + 71 + 73 + 79 + 83), member of a Ruth–Aaron pair with 492 under first definition, the 493d centered octagonal number is also a centered square number

494
494 = 2 × 13 × 19 = , sphenic number, nontotient

495

495 = 32 × 5 × 11, pentatope number

496

496 = 24 × 31. It is the third perfect number, a number whose divisors add up to the actual number (1+2+4+8+16+31+62+124+248=496).

497
497 = 7 × 71, sum of five consecutive primes (89 + 97 + 101 + 103 + 107), lazy caterer number

498
498 = 2 × 3 × 83, sphenic number, untouchable number, admirable number, abundant number

499
A prime number, isolated prime, Chen prime, 4499 - 3499 is prime

References 

Integers